Prithu (Sanskrit:  पृथु, Pṛthu, lit. "large, great, important, abundant") is a sovereign (chakravarti), featured in the Puranas. According to Hinduism, he is an avatar (incarnation) of the preserver god—Vishnu. He is also called Prithu, Prithi and Prithvi Vainya, literally, "Prithu — the son of Vena". Prithu is "celebrated as the first consecrated king, from whom the earth received her (Sanskrit) name, Prithvi." He is mainly associated with the legend of his chasing the earth goddess, Prithvi, who fled in the form of a cow and eventually agreed to yield her milk as the world's grain and vegetation. The epic Mahabharata, Vishnu Purana, and the Bhagavata Purana describe him as a part-avatar (incarnation) of Vishnu.

Legends

Birth 
The birth of Prithu is without female reproduction. Thus being a ayonija ("born without (the participation) of the yoni"), Prithu is untouched by desire and ego and can thus control his senses to rule with dharma.

The Bhagavata Purana, Vishnu Purana and Harivamsha and Mānava Purana tells the story of Prithu: King Vena, from the lineage of the pious Dhruva, was an evil king, who neglected Vedic rituals. Thus the rishis (sages) killed him, leaving the kingdom without an heir and in famine due to the anarchy of Vena. So, the sages churned Vena's body, out of which first appeared a dark dwarf hunter, a symbol of Vena's evil. He had coppery hair, red eyes and was of short stature. As he was very meek, the sages asked him to "Nishidha" (sit). Hence, he was called Nishadha, the founder of a race having his name. Since the sins of Vena had gone away as the dwarf, the body was now pure. On further churning, Prithu emerged from the right arm of the corpse.

Chasing the bovine earth 
To end the famine by slaying the earth and getting her fruits, Prithu chased the earth (Prithvi) who fled as a cow. Finally, cornered by Prithu, the earth states that killing her would mean the end of his subjects too. So, Prithu lowered his weapons and reasoned with the earth and promised her to be her guardian. Finally, Prithu milked her using Swayambhuva Manu as a calf, and received all vegetation and grain as her milk, in his hands for the welfare of humanity. Before Prithu's reign, there was "no cultivation, no pasture, no agriculture, no highway for merchants". It is said that the earth was created from the fat of the demons Madhu and Kaitabha. So, for many years, the earth lay barren. All civilisation emerged in Prithu's reign. By granting life to the earth and being her protector, Prithu became the earth's father and she accepted the patronymic name "Prithvi".

Following this example of Prithu, several living beings milked the earth. The list, according to Mānava Purana, is as follows:
 With Indra as the calf and Surya as a milkman, Devas collected milk from the earth (in the form of a cow) in golden vessels.
 With Chandra as the calf, Brihaspati as milkman and the Vedas as vessels, the sages obtained eternal devotion to Brahman in the form of milk
 With Yama as calf and Antaka as a milkman, the Pitru Devas (ancestors) collected milk in silver vessels
 With Takshaka like a calf, Airavata and Dhritarashtra as milkman the earth, while the other Nāgas, with the cavity of their palms, collected poison in the form of milk.
 With Virochana as the calf and the 2-headed Madhu as a milkman, the Asuras collected illusory powers in the form of milk, in iron vessels. 
 Making Kubera the calf, and 3-headed Rajatanabha as a milkman, the Yakshas obtained the ability to disappear, which was collected in the form of milk, in uncouth vessels
 With Sumali as calf and Rajatanabha (son of Yaksha) as a milkman, the Rakshasas and Pishachas collected blood (in the form of milk) in skull-caps
 Making Chitraratha as calf and Suruchi as a milkman, the Gandharvas and Apsaras milched Earth and obtained sweet perfumes, collecting it in lotuses
 Making Himalaya as a calf, Sumeru as a milkman, and huge mountains as vessels, the other mountains obtained many herbs and jewels
 Making Plaksha (white fig) as calf and Sala tree as milkman, the other trees collected milk, which revived the burnt trees and creepers

Literature 
The Manu Smriti considers Prithvi as Prithu's wife and not his daughter, and thus suggests the name "Prithvi" is named after her husband, Prithu.

The Vayu Purana records that when born, Prithu stood with a bow, arrows and an armour, ready to destroy the earth, which was devoid of Vedic rituals. Terrified, the earth fled in form of a cow and finally submitted to Prithu's demands, earning him the title chakravartin (sovereign). Prithu is the first king, recorded to earn the title. The creator-god Brahma is described to have recognized Prithu as an avatar of Vishnu, as one of Prithu's birthmark was Vishnu's chakram (discus) on his hand and thus Prithu was "numbered amongst the human gods". According to Oldham, the title Chakravarti may be derived from this birthmark, and may not be indicative of universal dominion. Prithu was worshipped as an incarnation of Vishnu in his lifetime and now is considered a Nāga demi-god. Shatapatha Brahmana (Verse 3.5.4.) calls him the first anointed king and Vayu Purana calls him Adiraja ("first king").

The epic Mahabharata states that Vishnu crowned Prithu as the sovereign and entered the latter's body so that everyone bows to the king as to god Vishnu. Now, the king was "endowed with Vishnu's greatness on earth". Further, Dharma (righteousness), Shri (goddess of wealth, beauty and good fortune) and Artha (purpose, material prosperity) established themselves in Prithu.

Reign 

In Hindu tradition, Prithu became the first true king. While he was crowned emperor of the world, many other sovereigns were appointed by Brahma. As per the Harivamsa, He became a Kshatriya after he healed the Brahmanas of their wounds, inflicted by Prithu's tyrannical father, Vena. After acquiring many presents from the gods, Prithu conquered and ruled the earth as well as the Devas, Asuras, Yakshas, Rakshasas and Nagas in all glory. It was where the Satya Yuga reached its pinnacle. Prithu liberated his father, Vena, from the hell called Pūt, hence all sons are called Putras. Practicing detachment, Prithu ruled according to the Vedas and the Dandaneeti.

Prithu used his Kshatriya power to make the earth yield its riches. Hence the earth is called Prithvi, daughter of Prithu. Prithu, by the mere fiat of will, created millions of men, elephants, chariots and horses. During his reign, there was no decrepitude, no calamity, no famine, no disease, no agriculture and no mining. Prithu enjoyed popularity amongst his subjects, hence all kings are called Rajas. Cows yielded buckets of rich milk when they were touched. Trees and lotuses always had honey in them. People were healthy and happy and had no fear of thieves or wild animals. There were no deaths of accidents. Kusha grass was golden in colour. Fruits were always sweet and ripe and nobody went hungry. People lived in houses or caves or trees or wherever they liked. For the first time, civilization and commerce came into existence.

Prithu himself shattered many mountains with his arrows and made the earth even. He had divine powers of creating or disappearing any mundane object with his mental power; ability to play musical instruments, sing and act. His chariot could travel over land, water and air with complete ease. Mountains made way for Prithu on his chariot and his flagstaff was never entangled when Prithu travelled through dense forests as the trees made way for him. Prithu practised charity and donated colossal amounts of gold to the Brahmanas.

Prithu appointed Shukracharya, the son of Bhrigu and Garga, the son of Angiras as his preceptors. The Valakhilyas, a group consisting of 60,000 thumb-sized ascetics and known for their genius, became Prithu's counsellors.

The Atharvaveda credits him of the invention of ploughing and thus, agriculture. He is also described as one who flattened the Earth's rocky surface, thus encouraging agriculture, cattle-breeding, commerce and development of new cities on earth. In a hymn in Rigveda, Prithu is described as a rishi (seer). D. R. Patil suggests that the Rigvedic Prithu was a vegetarian deity, associated with Greek god Dionysus and another Vedic god Soma.

Bhagavata Purana further states that Prithu performed ninety-nine ashvamedha yagnas (horse-sacrifices), but Indra, kings of the demi-gods, disturbed Prithu's hundredth one. The Yagya was abandoned, Vishnu gave Prithu his blessings and Prithu forgave Indra for the latter's theft of the ritual-horse. It also states that the Four Kumaras, the four sage-incarnations of Vishnu, preached Prithu about devotion to Vishnu. After governing his kingdom for a long time, Prithu left with his wife Archi, to perform penance in the forest in his last days. He experienced Samadhi and voluntarily gave up his body in the forest, and Archi went Sati on his funeral pyre.

Wives and children
Apart from Prithvi who is sometimes considered the daughter or wife of Prithu, Prithu has a wife called Archi and five sons. Archi, emerged from Vena's body, along with Prithu and is considered as an avatar of the goddess Lakshmi, the wife of Vishnu. Prithu's son Vijitsva, became the sovereign and controlled the middle of the kingdom. Prithu's other sons, Haryarksha, Dhumrakesha, Vrika and Dravina ruled the east, south, west and north of the kingdom respectively.

In popular culture
Chinese scholar Hiuen Tsang (c. 640 AD) records the existence of the town Pehowa, named after Prithu, "who is said to be the first person that obtained the title Raja (king)". Another place associated with Prithu is Prithudaka (lit. "Prithu's pool"), a town on the banks of Sarasvati river, where Prithu is believed to have performed the Shraddha of his father. The town is referred to as the boundary between Northern and central India and referred to by Patanjali as the modern Pehowa.

Shriman Narayan, one of the protagonists of Indian Panchayati Raj movement, tracing its origin, writes: "It is believed that the system was first introduced by King Prithu while colonizing the Doab between the Ganga and Jamuna."

References

Notes

Bibliography

External links 
 Srimad-Bhagavatam-text: Publisher ISKCON

Avatars of Vishnu
Mythological kings
Characters in the Bhagavata Purana